Pusiola straminea is a moth in the subfamily Arctiinae. It was described by George Hampson in 1901. It is found in the Democratic Republic of the Congo, Kenya, Rwanda and Uganda.

References

Moths described in 1901
Lithosiini
Moths of Africa